Mormodes aromatica is a species of orchid occurring from Mexico (Guerrero, Oaxaca, Chiapas) to Honduras.

References

aromatica
Orchids of Mexico
Orchids of Honduras
Plants described in 1841